Xia Wanchun (4 October 163116 October 1647) was a Ming dynasty poet and soldier. The son of Xia Yunyi and a child prodigy, Xia began writing poetry at a young age and died aged 17 while resisting the Manchu invaders.

Biography
Xia Wanchun established himself as a prodigious poet from a young age. He began writing poetry at age seven and was a disciple of Chen Zilong. At age nine, Xia could already produce fu verses in the ancient style. Xia's ci poems are noted for their "enthusiasm and pathos", with one such poem titled "Plucking Mulberries" reading:

At age 15, alongside his father, Xia joined the army in its anti-Qing campaign. He wrote of the fallen Ming soldiers: "Men of wisdom are dispersed like clouds, the state lies in ruins, alas! I have written eighteen jueju poems, and the pathos of these short songs exceeds that of any long lament. Only those endowed with qing are able to speak like this!" Like his father, Xia was killed by Manchu soldiers.

References

1631 births
1647 deaths
17th-century Chinese poets